The Zab Emirate was an emirate that ruled Biskra and the surrounding oases in the Zab region under the Banu Muzni family from mid 14th century to 1402 in the highlands and desert fringes of what is today eastern Algeria.

References 

Medieval Algeria
Former emirates
14th century in Africa